Centrolepis curta is a species of plant in the Restionaceae family and is found in Western Australia.

It blooms between May and August.

It is found on alluvial flats and damp areas of seepage in the Kimberley region of Western Australia where it grows in damp sandy-loam soils.

References

curta
Plants described in 1992
Flora of Western Australia
Poales of Australia